1854 Skvortsov is a stony background asteroid and relatively slow rotator from the middle region of the asteroid belt, approximately 9 kilometers in diameter. It was discovered on 22 October 1968, by Russian astronomer Tamara Smirnova at the Crimean Astrophysical Observatory in Nauchnyj on the Crimean peninsula. It is named after astronomer Evgenii Skvortsov.

Orbit and classification 

The asteroid orbits the Sun in the central main-belt at a distance of 2.2–2.9 AU once every 4.04 years (1,477 days). Its orbit has an eccentricity of 0.14 and an inclination of 5° with respect to the ecliptic.

Naming 

This minor planet was named in honor of Evgenii Skvortsov (1882–1952), an instructor of astronomy in the Simferopol Pedagogical Institute, an active observer of minor planets at the Crimean Simeiz Observatory, and the discoverer of several minor planets, including 1149 Volga, 1167 Dubiago and 1381 Danubia. The official  was published by the Minor Planet Center on 1 June 1975.

Physical characteristics

Rotation period 

In March 2006, a rotational lightcurve for Skvortsov was obtained from photometric observations made by American astronomer Brian D. Warner at his Palmer Divide Observatory in Colorado. It gave a rotation period of 78.5 hours with a brightness variation of 0.56 magnitude. This is a rather slow rotation rate compared to the average asteroid spin of 2–20 hours.

Diameter and albedo 

According to the survey carried out by NASA's Wide-field Infrared Survey Explorer with its subsequent NEOWISE mission, Skvortsov measures between 9.60 and 10.27 kilometers in diameter, and its surface has an albedo of 0.203 to 0.252. The Collaborative Asteroid Lightcurve Link assumes a standard albedo for stony asteroids of 0.20 and calculates a diameter of 8.97 kilometers with an absolute magnitude of 12.6.

References

External links 
 Lightcurve plot of 1854 Skvortsov, Palmer Divide Observatory, B. D. Warner (2006)
 Asteroid Lightcurve Database (LCDB), query form (info )
 Dictionary of Minor Planet Names, Google books
 Asteroids and comets rotation curves, CdR – Observatoire de Genève, Raoul Behrend
 Discovery Circumstances: Numbered Minor Planets (1)-(5000) – Minor Planet Center
 
 

001854
Discoveries by Tamara Mikhaylovna Smirnova
Named minor planets
19681022